Yord-e Khalaf (also known as Yūrd-e Khalaf) is a village in Behdasht Rural District, Kushk-e Nar District, Parsian County, Hormozgan Province, Iran. At the 2006 census, its population was 694, in 128 families.

References 

Populated places in Parsian County